Chimarrhis is a genus of flowering plants in the family Rubiaceae. It has 15 recognized species, native to Central America, South America and the West Indies.

Species 

Chimarrhis barbata (Ducke) Bremek.
Chimarrhis brevipes Steyerm.
Chimarrhis cubensis Steyerm.
Chimarrhis cymosa Jacq.
Chimarrhis duckeana Delprete
Chimarrhis ekmanii Borhidi
Chimarrhis gentryana Delprete
Chimarrhis glabriflora Ducke
Chimarrhis hookeri K.Schum.
Chimarrhis jamaicensis (Urb.) Steyerm.
Chimarrhis latifolia Standl.
Chimarrhis microcarpa Standl.
Chimarrhis parviflora Standl.
Chimarrhis speciosa (Steyerm.) Delprete
Chimarrhis turbinata DC.

References

External links 
 Chimarrhis in the World Checklist of Rubiaceae

Rubiaceae genera
Dialypetalantheae
Taxa named by Nikolaus Joseph von Jacquin